The Russian-American Building No. 29, also known as Tilson Building or Building No. 29, Sitka, is a historic commercial building at 202-206 Lincoln Street in Sitka, Alaska.  A National Historic Landmark, it is the only Russian colonial commercial structure standing in Sitka, and one of only two Russian colonial buildings in the city (the other is the Russian Bishop's House, also a National Historic Landmark.)

Description
A two-story gallery, sheltered by a shed roof, extended to the east. The interior walls are built from dimensionally smaller logs, and the floors were made of half-logs secured into joists and sills by tenons. The structure is estimated to have been built in the 1840s, at a time when many buildings were built by Finnish laborers brought in by Russian administrators, and was first used as for residential purposes.

The building has undergone a number of alterations in the intervening time, but these have managed to preserve much of its historic fabric.  It is unknown if it was sided at the time of its construction, but early images depict it with the same type of shiplap siding it has today.  Early images also show a two-story ell to its rear.  The building was originally built with its back directly on the waterfront; infill has created new land in this area.

In the 1880s the building underwent significant alterations.  An addition extended the gallery area further to the east, and a new roof fully incorporated this space into the structure.  Window spacing on this addition was made to match that of the main block, and the new roof was augmented by four equally-spaced gable-roof dormers.  The building underwent further modernizing work in the 1960s, some of which was in response to deterioration of the log structure.  It was the subject of a major rehabilitative effort in the mid-1980s.

The building was declared a National Historic Landmark and listed on the National Register of Historic Places in 1987.

See also

National Register of Historic Places in Sitka, Alaska
List of National Historic Landmarks in Alaska
List of the oldest buildings in Alaska

References

External links
 

Commercial buildings on the National Register of Historic Places in Alaska
Historic American Buildings Survey in Alaska
National Historic Landmarks in Alaska
Buildings and structures on the National Register of Historic Places in Sitka, Alaska
Residential buildings completed in 1867
Retail buildings in Alaska
Russian-American culture in Alaska